This is a list of National Historic Sites in Montreal, Quebec and surrounding municipalities on the Island of Montreal.  As of 2018, there are 61 National Historic Sites in this region, of which four (Lachine Canal, Louis-Joseph Papineau,  Sir George-Étienne Cartier and The Fur Trade at Lachine National Historic Site) are administered by Parks Canada (identified below by the beaver icon .  The site of the village of Hochelaga was designated in 1920, and was the first site designated in Montreal.

Numerous National Historic Events also occurred in Montreal, and are identified at places associated with them, using the same style of federal plaque which marks National Historic Sites. Several National Historic Persons are commemorated throughout the city in the same way. The markers do not indicate which designation—a Site, Event, or Person—a subject has been given.

National Historic Sites located elsewhere in Quebec are at List of National Historic Sites in Quebec, except for Quebec City, which are listed under National Historic Sites in Quebec City.

This list uses names designated by the national Historic Sites and Monuments Board, which may differ from other names for these sites.

National Historic Sites

See also

List of historic places in Montreal
History of Montreal
Architecture of Montreal

References

 
Montreal
National Historic Sites of Canada
History of Montreal